Nadiia Bielkina (born 30 September 1990) is a Russian (2002–2011) and Ukrainian (since 2012) biathlete.

Results

World Cup

Positions

IBU Cup

Individual podiums

Relay podiums

References

External links
 Profile on biathlon.com.ua
 Profile in BiathlonRusBase
 

1990 births
Ukrainian female biathletes
Russian female biathletes
Universiade medalists in biathlon
Living people
Russian emigrants to Ukraine
Naturalized citizens of Ukraine
People from Zvenigovsky District
Universiade gold medalists for Ukraine
Universiade bronze medalists for Ukraine
Competitors at the 2015 Winter Universiade
Competitors at the 2017 Winter Universiade
Sportspeople from Mari El